Minuphloeus mixtus is a species of beetle in the family Carabidae, the only species in the genus Minuphloeus.

References

Lebiinae